Carychium exiguum, common name the obese thorn snail, is a species of minute air-breathing land snail, a terrestrial pulmonate gastropod mollusk in the subfamily Carychiinae.

References

Ellobiidae